Novo Mundo (English: New World) is a Brazilian telenovela produced and broadcast by TV Globo. It is created by Alessandro Marson and Thereza Falcão, and directed by Vinícius Coimbra. It premiered on 22 March 2017 replacing Sol Nascente, ran for twenty-seven weeks, with a total of 160 episodes and ended its run on 25 September 2017.

Isabelle Drummond and Chay Suede portray the protagonists of the plot; Drummond plays an English teacher Anna and Suede portrays a Portuguese-Brazilian actor Joaquim, both fell in love in Europe and find themselves again in Brazil, where they decide to fight for their love, having to face obstacles from an officer that she possessively wants her and a false marriage with a Portuguese actress. The cast also features Gabriel Braga Nunes, Ingrid Guimarães, Agatha Moreira, Vivianne Pasmanter, Guilherme Piva, César Cardadeiro, Caio Castro and Letícia Colin.

The story of Novo Mundo continues in the 2021 telenovela Nos Tempos do Imperador.

Plot
Set in 1817, Anna Millman (Isabelle Drummond) is an English woman who teaches Portuguese who gets involved with the Portuguese-Brazilian actor Joaquim Martinho (Chay Suede) as both travel to Brazil in the ship that brings princess Maria Leopoldina of Austria (Letícia Colin) to her bethroted, Dom Pedro I (Caio Castro). Despite their love for each other, they suffer from the threats of Thomas Johnson (Gabriel Braga Nunes), an English officer who wants to have Anna for himself, and Elvira (Ingrid Guimarães), a Portuguese actress in a fake marriage with Joaquim, causing her to flee from the shrew when entering the ship that would leave for Brazil. The telenovela also features Brazil's struggle for independence.

Cast

Soundtrack

Reception

Ratings

References

External links
 

Brazilian telenovelas
2017 Brazilian television series debuts
TV Globo telenovelas
2017 telenovelas
Period television series
2017 Brazilian television series endings
Portuguese-language telenovelas
Television series based on actual events